"Don't Wanna Fight" is a song performed by American rock band Alabama Shakes, issued as the lead single from the band's second studio album Sound & Color. The band performed the song live for the first time on February 28, 2015 on Saturday Night Live. The song won two awards at the 58th Grammy Awards on February 15, 2016.

Critical reception
The song has received positive reviews from critics. Jon Blistein of Rolling Stone called the song a "chunky, funky soul cut" as well as a "knockout blow". The same magazine ranked "Don't Wanna Fight" at number 20 on its annual year-end list to find the best songs of 2015. Ann Powers of NPR called the song a "deep soul track" and further stated that the song is "just a taste" of what the band has to offer on the new album. In December 2015, the song received two Grammy Awards nominations for Best Rock Song and Best Rock Performance, winning both in February 2016. Stephen Thomas Erlewine on AllMusic described the song as "strong, boundless funk". NME described it as "taut, lascivious funk".

Charts

Year-end charts

Certifications

References

External links
 

2015 songs
2015 singles
Alabama Shakes songs
ATO Records singles
MapleMusic Recordings singles
Rough Trade Records singles
Song recordings produced by Blake Mills
Songs written by Brittany Howard
Grammy Award for Best Rock Song